East Timor competed at the 2017 World Aquatics Championships in Budapest, Hungary from 14 to 30 July.

Swimming

East Timor received a Universality invitation from FINA to send a female swimmer to the World Championships.

References

World Aquatics Championship
2017
Nations at the 2019 World Aquatics Championships